In mathematics, specifically functional analysis, the von Neumann bicommutant theorem relates the closure of a set of bounded operators on a Hilbert space in certain topologies to the bicommutant of that set. In essence, it is a connection between the algebraic and topological sides of operator theory.

The formal statement of the theorem is as follows:

Von Neumann bicommutant theorem. Let  be an algebra consisting of bounded operators on a Hilbert space , containing the identity operator, and closed under taking adjoints.

There are several other topologies on the space of bounded operators, and one can ask what are the *-algebras closed in these topologies. If  is closed in the norm topology then it is a C*-algebra, but not necessarily a von Neumann algebra. One such example is the C*-algebra of compact operators (on an infinite dimensional Hilbert space). For most other common topologies the closed *-algebras containing 1 are von Neumann algebras; this applies in particular to the weak operator, strong operator, *-strong operator, ultraweak, ultrastrong, and *-ultrastrong topologies.
 
It is related to the Jacobson density theorem.

Proof 

The theorem is equivalent to the combination of the following three statements:

(i) 
(ii) 
(iii) 

Proof of (i)
Therefore, for any operator  (and by substituting once  and once ), so is the map

Thus S′ is closed in the weak operator, i.e. S′ is weakly closed.

Proof of (ii)

Proof of (iii)
Fix . We will show .

By definition of the strong operator topology, U contains a finite intersection U(h1,ε1) ∩...∩U(hn,εn) of subbasic open sets of the form U(h,ε) = {O ∈ L(H): ||Oh - Xh|| < ε}, where h is in H and ε > 0.

Next we prove:

Lemma. .

Proof. Fix . Since , PTPx = TPx.

By definition of the bicommutant XP = PX. Since  is unital, hence . Then T lies in U(h,ε).

Non-unital case 

References 
W.B. Arveson, An Invitation to C*-algebras, Springer, New York, 1976.

Operator theory
Von Neumann algebras
Articles containing proofs
Theorems in functional analysis